Kálmán Marvalits (29 July 1901 in Nagykanizsa – 1 January 1982 in Siófok) was a Hungarian athlete who competed in the 1924 Summer Olympics and in the 1928 Summer Olympics.

References

1901 births
1982 deaths
Hungarian male discus throwers
Olympic athletes of Hungary
Athletes (track and field) at the 1924 Summer Olympics
Athletes (track and field) at the 1928 Summer Olympics
People from Nagykanizsa
Sportspeople from Zala County